Following is a list of LGBT monuments and memorials:

Americas

Brazil
 My Heart Beats Like Yours, Sculpture in Praça da República, 2018, São Paulo

Canada 
 Cherry Trees at Devonian Harbour Park; planted in 1985 and solemnized in 2019 with a plaque acknowledging them as one of the earliest AIDS memorials in the world
 Jim Deva Plaza, Vancouver; launched in 2016
 LGBTQ2+ National Monument, Ottawa; in development and planned for unveiling in 2025
 Parc de l'Espoir, Montreal; commemorates community members who have died of HIV/AIDS
 Statue of Alexander Wood, Toronto; dedicated May 28, 2005, destroyed April 4, 2022
 Toronto AIDS Memorial, Toronto; launched in 1993
 Vancouver AIDS Memorial, Vancouver; launched in 2004

Chile 
 Memorial por la Diversidad de Chile, in Santiago de Chile, 2014.

United States

California

 California LGBTQ Veterans Memorial, Desert Memorial Park, Cathedral City
 Harvey Milk Plaza, San Francisco
 Mattachine Steps, Los Angeles, United States; dedicated on April 7, 2012
 Matthew Shepard Human Rights Triangle, Crescent Heights Boulevard and Santa Monica Boulevard, West Hollywood; named for Matthew Shepard, and dedicated in April 1999
 National AIDS Memorial Grove, San Francisco
 Pink Triangle Park, San Francisco

Florida
 Pulse Memorial and Museum, Orlando

Illinois
 Legacy Walk, Chicago

Missouri
 Transgender Memorial Garden, St. Louis

New York
 Gay Liberation Monument, Manhattan, New York City
 LGBTQ Memorial, Hudson River Park (West Village), New York City; opened July 2018; artist Anthony Goicolea
 A Love Letter to Marsha, Manhattan, New York City
 Marsha P. Johnson Memorial Fountain, Hudson River Park (West Village), Manhattan, New York City
 Stonewall National Monument, Manhattan, New York City

Ohio
Natalie Clifford Barney Historic Marker, Dayton; dedicated on October 25, 2009

Oregon
 Never Look Away, Portland

Pennsylvania

 John Fryer Marker, 13th & Locust Streets Philadelphia 
 The Dewey's Sit-In Historic Marker,  17th and St. James streets, Philadelphia
 Edith Windsor Historical Marker, 13th & Locust Streets, Philadelphia
 Giovinni's Room, 345 S. 12th Street, Philadelphia
 Gloria Casarez Marker, Philadelphia
 Reminder Day Marker, Philadelphia
 Richard Schlegel Marker, Harrisburg
 Shapp Administration LGBT Initiatives, Harrisburg

Tennessee
 Penny Campbell Historical Marker, 1600 McEwen Avenue, Nashville; named in honor of LGBT activist, dedicated in December 2017
The Jungle and Juanita's Historical Marker, Seventh Avenue and Commerce Street, Nashville; in honor of two bars popular with gay men in the 1960s-1980s, raided by the police in 1963; dedicated in December 2018

Texas

 Pink Dolphin Monument, Galveston Island

Washington, D.C.
 Dr. Franklin E. Kameny House, 5020 Cathedral Avenue, NW. Gay activist Frank Kameny's house, listed on the National Register of Historic Places

Uruguay
 Plaza de la Diversidad Sexual, 2014, Ciudad Vieja, Montevideo

Europe

Belgium 

 My gay mythology - a monument to everyone, Brussels, 2007
 Regenboogmonument, Antwerp, 2015

Germany
Frankfurter Engel, Frankfurt, 1994
Memorial to gay and lesbian victims of National Socialism, Cologne, 1995
Memorial to Homosexuals Persecuted Under Nazism, Berlin, 2008

The Netherlands
 Homomonument

United Kingdom
 LGBT Memorial, National Holocaust Centre, Laxton, Nottingamshire, England
 Alan Turing Memorial, Manchester, England
 Alan Turing statue, Bletchley Park, England

France

 Les Marches de la Fierté, Nantes
 The Council of Paris named, unanimously, squares, garden and streets after LGBT heroes: place Harvey-Milk, rue Pierre-Seel, place Ovida-Delect, Federico García Lorca Garden (Paris), jardin Marie Thérèse-Auffray, rue Eva-Kotchever, Mark Ashton Garden, promenade Coccinelle, or events such as Stonewall Riots Square
 A commemorative plaque, situated rue Montorgueil in Paris, pays tribute to the couple Jean Diot and Bruno Lenoir; the two men were the last persons executed in France as punishment for homosexuality in 1750

Spain 
 Escultura al colectivo homosexual, Sitges
 Monolito en memoria a las personas represaliadas por el franquismo por su opción sexual, Durango
 Monumento en memoria de los gais, lesbianas y personas transexuales represaliadas, Barcelona
 Glorieta de la transexual Sònia, Barcelona
 Placa homenaje a los homosexuales encarcelados en la cárcel de Huelva, Huelva
 Plaza de Pedro Zerolo, Madrid
 Monuments in the Colonia Agrícola Penitenciaria de Tefía, Fuerteventura

Australia 

Sydney Gay and Lesbian Holocaust Memorial

Asia

Israel 
 Tel Aviv Gay and Lesbian Holocaust Memorial

References

LGBT monuments and memorials
Monuments and memorials